Qatar-4 is a faint K-dwarf star that hosts a planet in the constellation Andromeda. With an apparent magnitude of 13.60, it is impossible to detect with the naked eye, but can be detected with a powerful telescope. Qatar-4 is currently located 1,083 light years away based on parallax.

Properties 
This star is a relatively young star with an age of only 170 million years. At this age, it is still on the main sequence. Qatar-4 has 89.6% the mass of the Sun, and 84.9% the latter's radius.

Planetary system 
In 2016, the Qatar Exoplanet Survey discovered a planet around this star.

Qatar-4b is a Super-Jupiter orbiting the star Qatar-4 every 1.8 days. It was discovered in 2016 by the Qatar Exoplanet Survey (QES).

This planet has a very short orbit, with only 1.8 days for it to complete an orbit around Qatar-4. Despite that, it has a perfectly round orbit. Since the host is an active star, Qatar-4 may be destroyed by tidal waves from the star.

Qatar-4b has over 5 times the mass of Jupiter. Despite this, it has a radius that is only 13.5% larger than the latter's. This planet has an effective temperature of 1,385 K, which classifies as a hot Jupiter, and is denser than Jupiter, with about 4 times the density.

See also
Qatar-1
Qatar-2
Qatar-3
Qatar-5

References 

Andromeda (constellation)
K-type main-sequence stars
Planetary transit variables
Planetary systems with one confirmed planet